Gudalur Narayanaswamy Balasubramaniam (6 January 1910 – 1 May 1965), popularly known as GNB, was an Indian Carnatic singer. He innovated the art through emphasis on laya control and reducing the gamakas which eventually made Carnatic music appeal to the lay and the learned alike. He was also a Tamil film actor.Ariyakudi Iyengar inspired him.

In Gudalur, a small Tamil Nadu village close to Mayavaram, Balasubramanian was born. He was the son of G V Narayanaswamy Iyer, an enthusiastic music student. Throughout his younger years, he observed with utmost attention the techniques of the musicians of his day. Ariyakudi Ramanuja Iyengar became his manasika guru and inspiration. While his father dreamed of living in a villa at Luz Church road through GNB becoming a successful lawyer, the musician in GNB made way for greater goals in life. He completed his BA (Hons) in English Literature at the Christian College, Chennai, and took up a short music course at Annamalai University. under the guidance of T S Sabesa Iyer, but discontinued due to ill health. However, he joined the diploma course in music under Madras University in the first batch and Tiger Varadhachariar was the principal. Within 2 years, he was ready for concert performances. He gave his first concert in 1928.

Career
He acted in films, including Bama Vijayam (1934), Sathi Anusuya (1937),Sakuntalai (1940), Udayanan Vasavadatta (1947) (with Vasundhara Devi, mother of Vijayanthimala) and Rukmangadhan (1947). In "Sakunthalai", he appeared as Dushyantha, alongside the vocalist M.S. Subbulakshmi. M.S. Subbulakshmi was fascinated by his music and embraced his style completely in her early years as mentioned in the book M S - A Life in Music by TJS George. After a short stint in the film industry, GNB returned to the Carnatic music fraternity, until his passing in 1965.

GNB was known for brigha-laden and brisk music, and emerged as one of the most prominent Carnatic musicians of the era, drawing hundreds of people to each concert. He was famous for his renderings of "Vathapi Ganapathim" by Mutthuswamy Dikshitar and "Vinayaka Ninnu vina" by E. V. Ramakrishna Bhagavathar, both in the ragam Hamsadhwani. It was after hearing his rapid rendition of Vathapi that his father placed him under formal music training. He also frequently sang songs in the ragam Panthuvarali, such as "Paripalaya Sarasiruha" and "Siva Siva Siva", composed by Maharaja Swathi Thirunal and Tyagaraja Swami respectively. After singing either a long main piece or a Ragam Tanam Pallavi, famous ones being "Unadarishanam Kidai Kimo" in Kalyani and "Tilai Eesanai Ka" in Kambhoji, he would finish the concert with his popular bhajans and thukuddas, most notably "Dikku Teriyadha Kaatil"  by Subramanya Bharati, "Radha Mukha Kamala" in the ragam Hindustani Kapi by Sri Papanasam Sivan, and "Radha Sametha Krishna" in the raga Misra Yaman.

Sri GNB also released many records over his career, most notably the krithi "Vasudevayani" in the ragam Kalyani by Saint Tyagaraja, which reportedly earned him Rs 10,000, or around                   ₹818,153.88 in the present day. Other songs he was famous for include "Brochevarevarura" in Kamas by Mysore Vasudevachariar, "Marukelara O Raghava" in the ragam Jayanthasri by Saint Tyagaraja, "Maragathavallim Manasa" in Kamboji by Mutthuswamy Dikshitar, "Swaminatha Paripalaya" in Nattai by Mutthuswamy Dikshitar, "Ragasudha rasa" in Andholika by Saint Tyagaraja, and others.

He composed over 250 krithis, most in Telugu with a few in Sanskrit and Tamil. GNB also invented new ragas. He taught a number of students during his active years. Most famous among them are M. L. Vasanthakumari, Radha-Jayalakshmi duo, Tanjore S. Kalyanaraman, Trichur V. Ramachandran, T. R. Balu, T. S. Balasubramanian, and Ragini.

Administrative Role
GNB worked as the Deputy Chief Producer of Carnatic Music, in A.I.R Chennai for a number of years alongside Semmangudi Srinivasa Iyer who was the Chief Producer for Carnatic Music and Dr. M. Balamuralikrishna who was the Producer for Light Music. GNB joined the Swathi Thirunal College of Music, Thiruvananthapuram, Kerala as Principal in March 1964.

Personal life
He described the world of music as a perilous jungle and discouraged his sons and daughters from learning it. 
His health deteriorated and worsened after a major stroke in the late 1950s. He died on 1 May 1965, aged 55.

Compositions (Partial List)

See also
 List of Carnatic composers

References

 G.N.B. Global Centenary Celebrations

1910 births
1965 deaths
Male Carnatic singers
Carnatic singers
Carnatic composers
Sangeetha Kalanidhi recipients
Indian male composers
20th-century Indian male singers
20th-century Indian singers
20th-century Indian composers
People from Mayiladuthurai district
Recipients of the Sangeet Natak Akademi Award